Catophragmus is the originally named genus of the family Catophragmidae. At present, it is monotypical. It is a shallow water acorn barnacle of the Tropical Western Atlantic and Caribbean characterized by small accessory imbricating plates surrounding the base of the shell wall.

Diagnosis and discussion 
The shell wall of Catophragmus has eight free plates, with no fusion, and all entering the sheath. In contrast to Catolasmus, the other Northern Hemisphere catophragmid genus, imbricating plates extend only partway up the primary shell wall, and have usually four whorls, as opposed to 10. Many specimens have been recovered with few or no accessory plates remaining. 491 As the imbricating whorls are small and apparently deciduous, this is explained as a result of grazing gastropods.

The basis is calcareous, thin, and solid. Where it attaches to the shell wall, there are cavities matching small teeth on the basal edge of the wall plates. 491

The scutum differs from that of Catolasmus in showing a well defined lateral depressor muscle pit. The labrum bears teeth and bristles, unlike in Catolasmus.

There has been some confusion as to the exact date of Sowerby's publication. Both 1826 and 1827 can be found in different publications. This problem was addressed by Sykes, 1906, and he concluded 1826 was the correct date. Sykes is followed here, and by this editor.

Nomenclature 
 Type species: Catophragmus imbricatus Sowerby, 1826
 Fixation: monotypy, by Sowerby, 1826
 Type locality: Antigua, Leeward Islands,, attached to shell of Tetraclita porosa
 Types: two specimens in British Museum

Habitat and Geographic range 
Catophragmus imbricatus inhabits the lower littoral zone throughout the Western Atlantic (Bermuda) and West Indies. Although originally found on Antigua, it was not present there in 1998. Ross and Newman also reported occurrences in Cuba, Cozumel, and Islota Aves. These populations show sufficient differences in morphology to possibly belong to 2 or more species.

References

External links 

Barnacles
Maxillopoda